There are a number of cemeteries in Greater London. Among them are the Magnificent Seven, seven large Victorian-era cemeteries. There are also a number of crematoria. A number of cemeteries have listed buildings or structures, or have been placed on the National Register of Historic Parks and Gardens by English Heritage. Others have secured Green Heritage Site accreditation or may be on the UNESCO World Heritage List.

"The Magnificent Seven"
The Magnificent Seven cemeteries were the first commercial cemeteries constructed around the outskirts of London. They are all of special historical value and are on the English Heritage lists.

Abbreviations used in the column closed
C = Still used for cremations
F = Burial in family plots is still possible

Gallery

Jewish cemeteries

There are many Jewish cemeteries in London; they are not included here but some of them are listed at Jewish cemeteries in the London area.

Roman Catholic cemeteries

General cemeteries

No! = Cemetery is approaching capacity

Other burial grounds

Crematoria

Former cemeteries
Many of these cemeteries were former graveyards and carry the name of the church they belonged to.

M*, if a memorial or something similar was erected to commemorate the former burial ground or cemetery
? = Unknown
D = Disappeared
M = Memorial in the relocation site
P = Memorial plaque near or on the former site

See also
List of cemeteries in England
Hyde Park pet cemetery

Further reading
 Beach, Darren. London's Cemeteries (2006), Metro Guides, 231p, .
 Meller, Hugh & Brian Parsons. London Cemeteries: an illustrated guide and gazetteer (2008), Fourth Edition, The History Press, 416p, .
 London County Council, London Statistics Volume 24 1913-14, London County Council (1915), pp. 208–211

External links
London Cemeteries on the TimeTravelBritain website, written by Catherine Richards and photographs by Sue Bailey
Paul Talling's website, showing the dereliction of cemeteries in London
Jewish Cemeteries in London on the IAJGS website
Silent Cities Cemetery photography by Jeane Trend-Hill, showing the cemeteries of London

References

 
Cemeteries
Lists of cemeteries in the United Kingdom